Auberlen is a surname. Notable people with the surname include:

Bill Auberlen (born 1968), American racing driver
Karl August Auberlen (1824–1864), German Lutheran theologian